The white-headed marmoset (Callithrix geoffroyi), also known as the tufted-ear marmoset, Geoffroy's marmoset, or Geoffrey's marmoset, is a marmoset endemic to forests in eastern Brazil, where it is native to Bahia, Espírito Santo, and Minas Gerais, and introduced to Santa Catarina. It is known as the sagüi or sauim in Brazil. Its diet consists of fruits, insects, and the gum of trees.

References

white-headed marmoset
Mammals of Brazil
Endemic fauna of Brazil
white-headed marmoset
Taxa named by Étienne Geoffroy Saint-Hilaire